Juan Martín del Potro was the defending champion, but was unable to participate this year due to a wrist injury.

Milos Raonic won the title, defeating Vasek Pospisil, 6–1, 6–4, in the first-ever all-Canadian final on the ATP World Tour.

Seeds
All seeds received a bye into the second round.

 Tomáš Berdych (third round)
 Milos Raonic (champion)
 Grigor Dimitrov (withdrew due to flu-like symptoms)
 Kei Nishikori (quarterfinals)
 John Isner (second round)
 Richard Gasquet (semifinals)
 Kevin Anderson (quarterfinals)
 Feliciano López (second round)
 Ivo Karlović (third round)
 Santiago Giraldo (quarterfinals)
 Radek Štěpánek (second round)
 Jérémy Chardy (second round)
 Vasek Pospisil (final)
 Lleyton Hewitt (third round)
 Denis Istomin (third round)
 Lu Yen-hsun (second round)
 Julien Benneteau (second round)

Draw

Finals

Top half

Section 1

Section 2

Bottom half

Section 3

Section 4

Qualifying

Seeds

Qualifiers

Lucky losers
  Sam Groth

Qualifying draw

First qualifier

Second qualifier

Third qualifier

Fourth qualifier

Fifth qualifier

Sixth qualifier

References
General

Specific

Citi Open - Men's Singles